Eugene Newman Parker (June 10, 1927 – March 15, 2022) was an American solar and plasma physicist. In the 1950s he proposed the existence of the solar wind and that the magnetic field in the outer Solar System would be in the shape of a Parker spiral, predictions that were later confirmed by spacecraft measurements. In 1987, Parker proposed the existence of nanoflares, a leading candidate to explain the coronal heating problem.

Parker obtained his PhD from Caltech and spent four years as a postdoctoral researcher at the University of Utah. He joined University of Chicago in 1955 and spent the rest of his career there, holding positions in the physics department, the astronomy and astrophysics department, and the Enrico Fermi Institute. Parker was elected to the National Academy of Sciences in 1967. In 2017, NASA named its Parker Solar Probe in his honor, the first NASA spacecraft named after a living person.

Biography 
Parker was born in Houghton, Michigan to Glenn and Helen (MacNair) Parker on June 10, 1927. He received his Bachelor of Science degree in physics from Michigan State University in 1948 and a Doctor of Philosophy from Caltech in 1951. Parker spent four years at the University of Utah before joining the University of Chicago in 1955, where he spent the rest of his career. He held positions in Chicago's physics department, astronomy and astrophysics department, and the Enrico Fermi Institute. Parker was elected to the National Academy of Sciences in 1967.

Hypotheses 
In the mid-1950s, Parker developed the theory of the supersonic solar wind and predicted the Parker spiral shape of the solar magnetic field in the outer Solar System. His theoretical modeling was not immediately accepted by the astronomical community: when he submitted the results to The Astrophysical Journal, two reviewers recommended its rejection. The editor of the journal, Subrahmanyan Chandrasekhar, overruled the reviewers and published the paper anyway. Parker's theoretical predictions were confirmed by satellite observations a few years later, especially the 1962 Mariner 2 mission.

Parker's work increased understanding of the solar corona, the solar wind, the magnetic fields of both the Earth and the Sun, and their complex electromagnetic interactions. He published several textbooks, including Cosmical Magnetic Fields in 1979, and one on magnetic fields in X-ray astronomy in 1994. Seeking to address the coronal heating problem, in 1987 Parker proposed that the solar corona might be heated by myriad tiny "nanoflares", miniature brightenings resembling solar flares that would occur all over the surface of the Sun. Parker's theory became a leading candidate to explain the problem.

Personal life 
Parker was married to his wife, Niesje, for 67 years, with whom he had two children. He died in Chicago on March 15, 2022, at the age of 94.

Honors and awards 
 1969: Arctowski Medal of the National Academy of Sciences
 1969: Henry Norris Russell Lectureship of the American Astronomical Society
 1978: George Ellery Hale Prize, Solar Physics Division of the American Astronomical Society, first time this prize was awarded
1979: Chapman Medal, Royal Astronomical Society
 1989: National Medal of Science
 1990: William Bowie Medal
 1992: Gold Medal of the Royal Astronomical Society
 1997: Bruce Medal
 2003: Kyoto Prize
 2003: James Clerk Maxwell Prize of the American Physical Society. Citation: "For seminal contributions in plasma astrophysics, including predicting the solar wind, explaining the solar dynamo, formulating the theory of magnetic reconnection, and the instability which predicts the escape of the magnetic fields from the galaxy."
 2010: Member of the Norwegian Academy of Science and Letters.
 2017: NASA renamed its Solar Probe Plus to Parker Solar Probe after Parker, the first time that a space vessel was named after a living person. Parker was present at its August 12, 2018, launch.
 2018: Medal for Exceptional Achievement in Research of the American Physical Society. Citation: "For fundamental contributions to space physics, plasma physics, solar physics and astrophysics for over 60 years."
 2020: Crafoord Prize in Astronomy

Books 
 Cosmical Magnetic Fields: Their Origin and their Activity, 1979, Oxford University Press. .
 Spontaneous Current Sheets in Magnetic Fields: With Applications to Stellar X-rays, 1994, Oxford University Press. .
 Conversations on Electric and Magnetic Fields in the Cosmos, 2007, Princeton University Press. .

References 

1927 births
2022 deaths
20th-century American astronomers
21st-century American astronomers
American astrophysicists
American plasma physicists
Fellows of the American Physical Society
Fellows of the Royal Astronomical Society
Foreign Fellows of the Royal Astronomical Society
Kyoto laureates in Basic Sciences
Members of the Norwegian Academy of Science and Letters
Members of the United States National Academy of Sciences
Michigan State University alumni
National Medal of Science laureates
People from Houghton, Michigan
Recipients of the Gold Medal of the Royal Astronomical Society
Scientists from Michigan
University of Chicago faculty
University of Utah faculty
Writers from Michigan